The Columbia Lions fencing team is the intercollegiate fencing team for Columbia University located in Manhattan, New York City. The team competes in the Ivy League within Division I of the NCAA. The university first fielded a team in 1898, under the leadership of coach James Murray. The team is currently coached by Michael Aufrichtig.

The Blue Gym (or University Gym) is home to the Columbia Lion fencing team, located within the Dodge Physical Fitness Center on campus.

History
The team was founded in 1898, and has had some noteworthy successes. It has captured the NCAA national title 16 times, most recently in 2019.  It also won Intercollegiate Fencing Association national championships in 1898, 1913, 1914, 1918, 1919, and 1934. The team has also won 52 Ivy League Championships, capturing both the Men's and Women's titles outright in 2019.

Fencing for the team, Norman C. Armitage won the Intercollegiate Fencing Association saber championship in 1928, Emily Jacobson won the NCAA women's saber championship in 2005, and Daria Schneider won the NCAA women's saber championship in 2007.

The team has produced a number of Olympians, including five in 2012. Columbia grad Alen Hadzic was named as an alternate to the 2021 Olympic team, but was suspended by the United States Center for SafeSport due to findings of an investigation following allegations of rape and other sexual misconduct; an arbitrator later reduced his sanction, allowing him to go to Tokyo, though he did not fence.  Hadzic had previously been suspended by Columbia University for a year for sexual misconduct, while he was a member of the Columbia team, as a result of the findings of a Title IX investigation.

Notable former fencers

Norman C. Armitage (born Norman Cohn; 1907-1972), 6-time Olympic fencer
Robert Blum (born 1928), 2-time Olympic fencer
Bob Cottingham (born 1966), Olympic fencer
Jacqueline Dubrovich (born 1994), Olympic fencer
Sherif Farrag (born 1987), Olympic fencer
 Joel Glucksman (born 1949), Olympic fencer
Asher Grodman (born 1987), actor
Jacob Hoyle (born 1994), Olympic fencer
Emily Jacobson (born 1985), Olympic fencer
Dan Kellner (born 1976), Olympic fencer
Stephen Kovacs (1972–2022), fencer and coach, charged with sexual assault, died in prison
James Margolis (born 1936), Olympic fencer
James Melcher (born 1939), Olympic fencer
Nzingha Prescod (born 1992), Olympic fencer
Nicole Ross (born 1989), Olympic fencer
Hal Scardino (born 1984), actor
Daria Schneider (born 1987), saber team bronze medalist in World Fencing Championships (2011 and 2012)
Erinn Smart (born 1980), Olympic fencer
Jeff Spear (born 1988), Olympic fencer
Cornel Wilde (born Kornél Weisz; 1912–1989), Hungarian-American actor  
James Leighman Williams (born 1985), Olympic fencer

Year-by-year results

Men's fencing

Women's fencing

References

External links
 

 
Sports clubs established in 1898